Qezel Qaleh-ye Kuranlu (also Romanized as Qezel Qal‘eh-ye Kūrānlū; also known as Qazel Qal‘eh and Qezel Qal‘eh) is a village in Charuymaq-e Jonubesharqi Rural District, Shadian District, Charuymaq County, East Azerbaijan Province, Iran. At the 2006 census, its population was 185, in 33 families.

References 

Populated places in Charuymaq County